John Virgo (born 4 March 1946) is an English snooker commentator and former professional snooker player.

Snooker career

Early professional career (1973–1978)
Virgo's first notable appearance in a major tournament was during the 1973 American Pool Tournament for The Indoor League where he lost in the semi-final. He turned professional in 1976, at a time when players such as Ray Reardon, John Spencer and Eddie Charlton were at the forefront of the sport. Although he had just turned 30 upon turning pro, Virgo was still among the youngest players on the circuit at the time. In 1977, he reached the semi-finals of the 1977 UK Championship losing to eventual winner Patsy Fagan by a single frame 8–9.

UK Champion and Top 10 player (1979–1990)
Virgo's snooker-playing fortunes peaked in 1979 when he reached the semi-final of the World Championship, and went on to win the 1979 UK Championship (though this was not a ranking event at the time). En route to the final, he beat Tony Meo, Steve Davis and Dennis Taylor. He overcame the reigning world champion Terry Griffiths in the final, despite being controversially docked two frames because of a miscommunication regarding the start time of the next session of play. He reached his highest ranking, world number 10, during the 1979–80 season.

In 1986, Virgo reached the semi-finals of the British Open, losing 4–9 to Willie Thorne. He ended the 1989–90 season as world number 14, but dropped out of the elite top 16 the following season.

Later career and retirement (1991–1995)
In 1993, Virgo entered the qualifying stages of the Grand Prix and the UK Championship but failed to qualify for the main events, losing both times in round seven. Virgo retired from professional play in 1994.

Television career
As part of his exhibition performances, Virgo performed trick shots and comedic impressions of other snooker players. During the 1981 World Championship, he performed some of his impressions, including Alex 'Hurricane' Higgins, Steve Davis and Ray Reardon. He repeated this act in further World Championships, usually after semi-finals that had ended earlier than expected.

He is now a TV snooker commentator, working primarily during the BBC's coverage of ranking events. 

From 1991 to 2002, Virgo was co-presenter of the snooker-based TV game show Big Break with Jim Davidson. During each show, Virgo participated in the "trick shots" segment, where a competitor who had been ousted from the main quiz would try to copy a complicated snooker shot performed by Virgo in order to win a prize. He coined the catchphrase "Pot as many balls as you can", when asked by Davidson to explain the rules to the snooker players.

Virgo is known for shouting "Where's the  going?" during his commentaries, whenever a shot is played in such a way that the cueball is in danger of going into one of the pockets.

On 27 April 2022, Virgo announced that he and his co-commentator Dennis Taylor had been axed by the BBC because they were too old for the current game play style, and that with some relief from production staff the 2022–23 snooker season would be their last as commentators for the broadcaster.

Other activities
Virgo's tribute book to Alex Higgins, Let Me Tell You About Alex, was published in February 2011 and described as "explosive". In April 2012, his book Amazing Snooker Trick Shots was published.

In 2012, Virgo featured in Nicholas Gleaves' debut radio play Sunk who guides a young man in his dream of becoming a snooker champion while battling to avoid a life of crime. This was broadcast on BBC Radio 4.

Virgo worked with a pool and snooker table company called Liberty Games to create a web-based series of trick shot videos known as the Trick Shot Academy.

In 2014, Virgo released a trick shot app, John Virgo's Snooker Trick Shots, available on Apple and Android devices.

Personal life
Virgo has two children, a son, Gary, from his first marriage, and a daughter, Brook Leah, from his second marriage. He separated from his first wife, Avril, in 1991, after eight years together. In 2009, he married Rosie Ries, then deputy managing director at John Blake Publishing.`

Performance and rankings timeline

Career finals

Non-ranking finals: 6 (4 titles)

Pro-am finals: 1

References

External links

 Official Site with Links to JV's FREE App, Twitter & Facebook
 http://www.worldsnooker.com/players/john-virgo/

1946 births
Living people
BBC sports presenters and reporters
English game show hosts
English snooker players
English television presenters
Sportspeople from Salford
People from Cobham, Surrey
Snooker writers and broadcasters
Trick shot artists
UK champions (snooker)